Table Mountain National Park, previously known as the Cape Peninsula National Park, is a national park in Cape Town, South Africa, proclaimed on 29 May 1998, for the purpose of protecting the natural environment of the Table Mountain Chain, and in particular the rare fynbos vegetation. The park is managed by South African National Parks. The property is included as part of the UNESCO Cape Floral Region World Heritage Site.

The park contains two well-known landmarks: Table Mountain, for which the park is named; and the Cape of Good Hope, the most southwestern extremity of Africa.

History 
Arguments for a national park on the Cape Peninsula, centred on Table Mountain, began in earnest in the mid-1930s. The Table Mountain Preservation Board was set up in 1952, and in 1957 its recommendation to the National Monuments Board was accepted and Table Mountain was declared a national monument. In the mid 1960s, the Cape Town City Council declared nature reserves on Table Mountain, Lion's Head, Signal Hill, and Silvermine. Following high fire incidence in the 1970s, Douglas Hey was appointed to assess the ecological state of Table Mountain and the southern Peninsula, and he recommended (1978) that all the Peninsula's mountains above 152m should be conserved. This laid the foundations for the Cape Peninsula Protected Natural Environment (CPPNE) area, finally established in 1989. However, environmental management was still bedevilled by the fragmented nature of land ownership on the Peninsula. Following a big fire above the city bowl in 1991, Attorney General Frank Kahn was appointed to reach consensus on a plan for rationalising management of the CPPNE. In 1995, Prof. Brian Huntley recommended that SANParks be appointed to manage the CPPNE, with an agreement signed in April 1998 to transfer around 39,500 acres to SANParks. On 29 May 1998, then-president Nelson Mandela proclaimed the Cape Peninsula National Park. The park was later renamed to the Table Mountain National Park.

Geography
The park runs approximately north–south along the range of mountains that make up the mountainous spine of the Cape Peninsula, from Signal Hill in the north, through Lion's Head, Table Mountain, Constantiaberg, Silvermine, the mountains of the southern Peninsula, terminating at Cape Point.

The park is not a single contiguous area; the undeveloped mountainous areas which make up most of the park are separated by developed urban areas on the shallower terrain. Thus the park is divided into three separate sections, as listed below.

Table Mountain section

This section covers Signal Hill, Lion's Head, Table Mountain proper, including the Back Table (the rear, lower part of the mountain), Devil's Peak, the Twelve Apostles (actually a series of seventeen peaks along the Atlantic seaboard), and Orange Kloof (a specially protected area not open to the public). It borders on central Cape Town in the north, Camps Bay and the Atlantic coast in the west, the Southern Suburbs in the east, and Hout Bay in the south.

This section was formed from the Table Mountain National Monument, Cecilia Park, and Newlands Forest. Kirstenbosch National Botanical Garden is not officially part of the national park, but its higher reaches are maintained as part of the park.

Silvermine-Tokai section

This section runs northwest–southeast across the Peninsula from the Atlantic seaboard to the False Bay coast. It covers Constantiaberg, Steenberg Peak and the Kalk Bay mountains. It borders on Hout Bay in the north-west, the suburbs of Constantia and Tokai in the north-east, Kalk Bay in the south-east, and Fish Hoek and Noordhoek in the south-west.

This section was formed from the Tokai State Forest and the Silvermine Nature Reserve.

Cape Point section

This section covers the most southern area of the Cape Peninsula, stretching from Cape Point and the Cape of Good Hope in the south, as far north as Scarborough on the Atlantic coast and Simon's Town on the False Bay coast. It was formed from the Cape of Good Hope Nature Reserve.

Flora

This area forms part of the Cape Floristic Region and as such supports a high diversity of flora, much of which is rare and endemic. Protea, erica, restio and Asteraceae species, as well as geophytes, are all found in abundance. The main indigenous vegetation types are Peninsula Sandstone Fynbos and Cape Granite Fynbos, both of which are endangered and endemic to Cape Town - occurring nowhere else in the world.

In addition, some sections of the park are the natural home of deep, indigenous Afro-temperate forests.

A well known local tree is the Silver tree (Leucadendron argenteum), a popularly cultivated species which is found in the wild only on the slopes of Lion's Head and a few scattered locations elsewhere on the Cape Peninsula (a notable area is above Kirstenbosch).

The Park lies in the heart of the Cape Floral Kingdom, which is a bio-diversity hot spot and seen by botanists as a botanical anomaly. In fact, there are more species of plants in Table Mountain National Park (over two thousand) than exist in the whole of the United Kingdom. 
Much of the unique flora in the area surrounding the park has been lost to agriculture and urban development.

Indigenous plants are being increasingly harvested for traditional medicines, an activity some regard as a form of poaching. Such produce can be found on sale as remedies on the streets of Cape Town's central business district. Indigenous species are also threatened by invasive plants such as Acacia cyclops, three Hakea species, and invasive pines that were planted in commercial timber plantations on the slopes of the mountain also . Today the Table Mountain range has the highest concentration of threatened species of any continental area of equivalent size in the world.

Removal of non-indigenous forests

SANParks have been criticised for their programme of removing invasive non-indigenous trees. These alien forests make up only 2% of the park, but cover areas that were previously incredibly rich in biodiversity.

Some of the mature alien invasive trees that pose a threat to the fynbos region are Port Jackson, Rooikrans, Hakea, Pine and Blue Gum.

The invasive trees were originally planted as commercial plantations for timber, once most of the indigenous afro-montane forests had been felled. Unfortunately, the fertile lower slopes that were selected for the plantations are also the areas of the park which host the highest proportion of endemic and threatened species.

The park's current programme is to allow for the re-growth of the indigenous forests, while slowly removing the plantations of invasive trees. This removal has been controversial however, as some of the pine plantations are recreational areas for people living in the wealthy suburbs adjacent to the park.

Fauna

Larger predators that historically roamed the area include the Cape lion, leopard (which persisted as late as the 1920s, and tracks are claimed to still be found today), as well as spotted hyena and black-backed jackal. Large herbivores similarly disappeared at the hands of the European settlers, for example elephant, black rhinoceros, kudu, eland, mountain zebra and bontebok, although the last three species were re-introduced to the Cape Point section of the park.

Smaller mammals are still found in the park: caracal, rock hyrax and a variety of small antelope species, such as the Cape grysbok and notably the recently re-introduced klipspringer.

The population of the alien Himalayan tahr originated from a pair that escaped from the now defunct Zoological Gardens on Groot Schuur Estate below Devil's Peak in 1935. As of 2006, virtually all tahrs have been culled from Table Mountain, thus clearing the way for the re-introduction of the smaller klipspringer, with which the tahr would have competed due to similar niches. However it is still highly likely that a few survived.

Chacma baboons inhabit the southern parts of the park. They are highly visible and popular with tourists, but are capable of becoming extremely dangerous when they become accustomed to human beings and start to associate them with free food. Many residents who live in places close to the park, such as Da Gama Park, Tokai and Scarborough, often clash with baboons which have attempted, and succeeded, in raiding their houses for food and many resort to measures such as reinforcing their security by erecting electric fences, and illegal measures like shooting them with pellet guns, running them over, and setting dogs on them. This is ineffective as it can maim the baboons and simply reinforce their penchant for gaining easy food, as it is easier for baboons to raid a dustbin for scraps rather than forage in the mountains with only one hand. Thus it is imperative that visitors to the park are not allowed to feed the baboons at all.

A rare endemic species of amphibian is only found on Table Mountain, the Table Mountain ghost frog. The Park lies in the heart of the Cape Floral Kingdom, which is a bio-diversity hot spot and seen by botanists as a botanical anomaly. In fact, there are more species of plant in Table Mountain National Park (over two thousand) than exist in the whole of the United Kingdom.

Marine Protected Area 

The Table Mountain National Park Marine Protected Area is an inshore marine protected area around the Cape Peninsula. It was proclaimed in Government Gazette No. 26431 of 4 June 2004 in terms of the Marine Living Resources Act, 18 of 1998.

The MPA is of value for conservation of a wide range of endemic species, and has considerable economic value as a tourist destination. It encloses a large number of recreational dive sites visited by local residents and tourists from further afield. The shark and whale watching tourist industries are also represented, and there are several popular surf breaks. The MPA is mainly a controlled zone where extractive activities are allowed under permit, with six small no-take zones. The MPA is administrated by the Table Mountain National Park.

The marine ecology is unusually varied for an area of this size, as a result of the meeting of two major oceanic water masses near Cape Point, and the park extends into two coastal marine bioregions. The ecology of the west or "Atlantic Seaboard" side of the park is noticeably different in character and biodiversity to that of the east, or "False Bay" side. Both sides are classified as temperate waters, but there is a significant difference in average temperature, with the Atlantic side being noticeably colder on average.

The MPA contains culturally significant fish traps, historical wrecks and traditional fishing communities, and is also important for commercial fisheries. Part of the  West Coast rock lobster industry takes place within the MPA – as well as recreational and subsistence fishers, and an illegal poaching industry mostly targeting abalone, rock lobster and territorial linefish from the no-take zones.

Tourist attractions

 The Table Mountain Cableway carries visitors from the Lower Cable Station on Kloofnek Road to the top of Table Mountain, allowing visitors to avoid the fairly arduous walk up.
 Boulders Beach, south of Simon's Town, contains a large colony of African penguins.
 Cape Point and the Cape of Good Hope are very scenic, although they are neither the most southern tip of Africa nor the meeting place of the Atlantic and Indian Oceans, as is often believed.

See also
 
 
 
 
 
 
 
 
 2021 Table Mountain fire - Major Fire in the National Park

References

 McNeely, Jeffrey A., 2001, "Globally significant biodiversity within city limits: the case of South Africa's Cape", Parks, vol. 11 no. 3, pp. 44–46. Retrieved on 18 January 2006.
 2000, South African National Map Series 1:50 000 Topographical Sheets 3318CD Cape Town and 3418AB&AD Cape Peninsula. Published by Chief Directorate: Surveys & Mapping.
 Table Mountain National Park. Retrieved on 18 January 2006.
 Cool Forests of Cape Town. Retrieved on 13 October 2006.
https://web.archive.org/web/20060926193042/http://www.carteblanche.co.za/display/Display.asp?Id=3165 No compromise on pines. Carte Blanche report on the loss of recreational non-indigenous forests. Retrieved on 14 October 2006.

External links

  official Table Mountain National Park−TMNP website

 
Protected areas of the Western Cape
Protected areas established in 1998
1998 establishments in South Africa
Natural history of Cape Town